Lada Kozlíková (born 8 October 1979) is a Czech Republic road and track racing cyclist. She won a gold medal at the 2002 UCI Track Cycling World Championships in the scratch race. She competed at the 2000, 2004 and 2008 Summer Olympics.

References

External links
 

1979 births
Living people
People from Vyškov
Czech female cyclists
Cyclists at the 2000 Summer Olympics
Cyclists at the 2004 Summer Olympics
Cyclists at the 2008 Summer Olympics
Olympic cyclists of the Czech Republic
UCI Track Cycling World Champions (women)
Czech track cyclists
Sportspeople from the South Moravian Region